Question and Answer is an album by guitarist Pat Metheny with acoustic bassist Dave Holland and drummer Roy Haynes.
Metheny won the 1991 Grammy Award for Best Instrumental Composition  for "Change of Heart"

Track listing

Personnel
 Pat Metheny – guitar, Synclavier on "Three Flights Up"
 Dave Holland – double bass
 Roy Haynes – drums

Charts
Album – Billboard

Awards
Grammy Awards

References

1989 albums
Pat Metheny albums
Geffen Records albums